The Cheras War Cemetery is the final resting place for Allied personnel who were killed during World War II, particularly the Malayan Campaign and the Japanese occupation of Malaya. Servicemen who died after the war or during their posting in northern Malaya prior to the Malayan Emergency are also interred here.

The cemetery is located near Cheras Christian Cemetery, along national highway 1, and was erected and maintained by the Commonwealth War Graves Commission.

Notable burials

 Sir Henry Gurney – British High Commissioner in Malaya
 Remains of the Royal Air Force personnel in the RAF Dakota C4 crash at Gua Musang, Kelantan on 25 August 1950 (relocated on 15 March 2012)
 Remains of the Royal Air Force personnel in the RAF B-24 Liberator KL654/R crash at Kuala Pilah, Negeri Sembilan in August 1945 (relocated on 18 October 2012)

See also 
 Taiping War Cemetery, Taiping
 Kranji War Cemetery, Singapore
 Labuan War Cemetery, Labuan

References

External links
 
 

Cemeteries in Kuala Lumpur
Commonwealth War Graves Commission cemeteries in Malaysia
1946 establishments in British Malaya